The following is a list of squads for each national team competing at the 2014 UEFA European Under-17 Championship in Malta. The tournament was scheduled to start on 9 May and the final will take place in Ta'Qali in the National Stadium on 21 May 2014. Each national team had to submit a squad of 18 players born after 1 January 1997. Although some associations have published a list of players, the regulations state that the teams only need be submitted to UEFA before 12:00 CET on 8 May. The number of caps and goals listed below are from before the tournament started.

Players in boldface have been capped at full international level at some point in their career.

Group A

England
Head coach:  John Peacock

Malta
Head coach:  Sergio Soldano

Netherlands
Head coach:  Maarten Jan-Willem Stekelenburg

Turkey
Head coach:  Hakan Tecimer

Group B

Portugal
Head coach:  Emílio Peixe

Germany
Head coach: Christian Wück

Scotland
Head coach:  Scot Gemmill

Switzerland
Head coach:  Yves Débonnaire

References

External links
Official tournament squads site at UEFA

2014 UEFA European Under-17 Championship
UEFA European Under-17 Championship squads